Stewart Murray "Skip" Alexander, Jr. (August 6, 1918 – October 24, 1997) was an American collegiate and professional golfer.  

Alexander was born in Philadelphia, Pennsylvania, but was raised in Durham, North Carolina. He attended Duke University from 1937 to 1940.  During that time, he helped Duke win the Southern Conference Championship in golf three times, won the individual conference title twice, was a two-time Southern Intercollegiate medalist and twice reached the quarter-finals of the National Intercollegiate Tournament.

Alexander turned professional in 1941 and joined the PGA Tour in 1946.  In 1948 he won his first tour event, the Tucson Open. He would win twice more on tour.

On September 24, 1950, Alexander was the lone survivor of a plane crash in Evansville, Indiana, in which he was severely burned over 70% of his body.  After 17 operations, one of which was to permanently freeze his badly burned fingers around the grip of a golf club instead of removing them, he returned to help the United States win the 1951 Ryder Cup.  Sam Snead, the Ryder Cup captain that year, paired Alexander against the British champion, John Panton, in the singles portion of the competition.  Although the thought was that it might well be a throwaway match, it would at least save their other players from playing Panton, who was beating everyone at that time.  Alexander, with both hands bleeding, won the match by the largest margin in Ryder Cup history to that point, 8 & 7.

Alexander served as the golf pro at Lakewood Country Club (now known as St. Petersburg Country Club) in St. Petersburg, Florida starting in 1951, and served in that capacity for 34 years.

Alexander was awarded the 1959 Ben Hogan Award for golfers who make a comeback after suffering a physical handicap. He was inducted into the Carolinas Golf Hall of Fame in 1986 and in 1987 was inducted for into the North Carolina Sports Hall of Fame as well as the Duke Hall of Fame. His son Buddy, a former U.S. Amateur champion (1986) was the head golf coach at the University of Florida in Gainesville, Florida from 1988–2014. He also coached at Georgia Southern University (1977–80) and Louisiana State University (1983–87).

Alexander died at his home in St. Petersburg.

Amateur wins
this list may be incomplete
1941 North and South Amateur

Professional wins

PGA Tour wins (3)

Other wins
this list may be incomplete
1946 Carolinas Open, Gainesville Open

Team appearances
Ryder Cup: 1949 (winners), 1951 (winners)

References

American male golfers
Duke Blue Devils men's golfers
PGA Tour golfers
Ryder Cup competitors for the United States
Golfers from Philadelphia
Sportspeople from Durham, North Carolina
Sportspeople from St. Petersburg, Florida
1918 births
1997 deaths